Tony Angelo (born December 24, 1978) is an American professional drift racer and stunt driver. Tony formerly drove in the Formula Drift series in his 2013 Scion FR-S for Scion Racing and is also the former host for Motor Trend Channel's Hot Rod Garage.

Career
Tony began building and modifying his own cars as a teenager in his hometown of Doylestown, PA.  In the late 90s, Tony was inspired to start drifting by Japanese videos and magazines.  He and friend and future pro-driver Chris Forsberg soon helped to start East Coast grassroots drifting events which quickly took off.

In 2003,  Tony personally gained national exposure in an article in Wired Magazine at the same time that drifting was gaining massive popularity.  At this time doors began to open for Tony to race in the pro series.

Tony began racing professionally in 2004 in Formula Drift’s first year.  He was quickly seen as a force on the track.  In 2005, Tony earned his D1 license by placing first in a national driver’s search.

After years in FD as a serious competitor, Tony took a break from driving professionally in the U.S. in 2009 and became a judge for Formula Drift.  Tony is credited with having majorly changed FD judging and scoring format for the better during this time.

Tony returned to the driver’s seat in 2012 for Scion Racing in his 2009 Scion tC.

In 2013, Tony purchased a salvage Scion FR-S that had been damaged during Hurricane Sandy.  In just ten weeks, Tony and his TAngelo Racing team transformed the car into his 750 hp racecar.

Tony Angelo also does stunt work, having driven in ads for Audi, Nissan and Chevrolet.

Tony is the founder and president of Drift Alliance, based out of Englishtown, New Jersey. He is also a member of the Blood Masters team. Tony often drifts his Lexus SC 300 missile car at grassroots events alongside amateur drivers at the Englishtown track where his career started.

Tony was a host on the Motor Trend show Hot Rod Garage, which he left after 6 seasons.

Achievements
 President of Drift Alliance 
 Multiple Formula Drift top 10 and top 8 finished
 2013 FD Palm Beach Top 16
 2013 FD Palm Beach Top FR-S qualifier
 2013 Drift Week Triple Crown at Pikes Peak - 3rd Place
 2012 FD Palm Beach Top Scion qualifier
 2012 FD Palm Beach Top 4-cylinder qualifier
 2012 Top 32 Qualifier all Formula Drift events
 2010 FX Open Belarus - 5th Place
 3 Formula Drift Team Drift wins
 1st place D1 driver’s search
 Fastest qualifier record on fastest FD track, Evergreen Speedway

Sponsors

 Scion Racing
 Hoonigan
 Hankook Tires
 Exedy Clutches
 Alpinestars
 Electric Visual
 Brian Crower
 Recaro
 FTW Fuels
 Mothers

References

External links 
 Tony Angelo Driver Page at Scion.com
 Formula Drift Profile
 
 
 
 

Racing drivers from Pennsylvania
D1 Grand Prix drivers
Drifting drivers
Living people
Formula D drivers
1978 births